Heinrich Gerns (April 22, 1892 – August 20, 1963) was a German politician of the Christian Democratic Union (CDU) and former member of the German Bundestag.

Life 
In 1945 he was co-founder of the CDU in the Plön district and became district chairman there in 1952. He was a member of the German Bundestag from its first election in 1949 until his death.

Literature

References

1892 births
1963 deaths
Members of the Bundestag for Schleswig-Holstein
Members of the Bundestag 1961–1965
Members of the Bundestag 1957–1961
Members of the Bundestag 1953–1957
Members of the Bundestag 1949–1953
Members of the Bundestag for the Christian Democratic Union of Germany